Jonathan Morali (born 22 May 1980) is a French composer, songwriter, singer, founder and frontman of the band Syd Matters. He is also the composer of many films and videogames original scores (e.g., Life Is Strange, Life Is Strange 2).

Biography

Debut and Syd Matters 
Jonathan Morali was born in Paris on 22 May 1980. He began his performing career playing at small bars until he was noticed by Third Side Records and signed to a recording contract. His first album, A Whisper and a Sigh, which was recorded during the summer of 2002 and released 28 June 2004. Developing an atmospheric folk-pop style that featured acoustic settings combined with electronica-influenced touches that sounded a bit like a hybrid between Nick Drake and Radiohead.

Since Syd Matters’ debut, their experimental genre has been continuously reviewed by critics. Their second album, "Someday We Will Foresee Obstacles", brought the band mainstream attention with a review in the 32nd issue of Music Week. The unique sound they produce has been said to draw inspiration from genres such as prog rock, dub music, and Traditional pop, while also resembling that of singer-songwriter artists but at its core is often considered a mix between folk and electronic genres. In their reviews, they have also been compared to other artists such as Fleet Foxes, Fionn Regan, Grandaddy, The Flaming Lips, and Nick Drake.

Songs featured in media 

His songs "To All of You" ("American Girls") and "Hello Sunshine", a Super Furry Animals cover, were featured in the television series The O.C. in season 3's The Party Favor and season 4's The Metamorphosis, respectively. Additionally, "Obstacles" and "To All of You" were featured in Dontnod Entertainment's 2015 video game Life Is Strange.

Featured Syd Matters songs :
 Newport Beach (The O.C.) (série télévisée), saison 3, épisode Le Barbecue coréen (The Party Favor) de Michael Lange (2006)
 Ma première fois by Marie-Castille Mention-Schaar (2012)
 Upside Down by Juan Solanas – songs River Sister and Obstacles (2012)
 Clara Sheller (TV series)
 Video game Life Is Strange – songs Obstacles and To All of You

Film score 

In addition to his career with Syd Matters, Morali is a film composer. His most notable works are the soundtracks for Möbius, Les Adoptés (The Adopted), and La Question humaine, the latter of which was composed under the name Syd Matters.
Morali also collaborated with director Rémi Chayé to create the score for the animated film Long Way North (2015), where he included two tracks by Syd Matters in the soundtrack.

Video games and Life Is Strange 

Morali is also well-known for the creation of Life Is Strange and Life Is Strange 2 original scores. A gamer himself, he had been contacted by directors Raoul Barbet and Michel Koch to work on the first season of Life Is Strange at the very beginning of the development of the game. Director Raoul Barbet wanted to have some songs from his band in the game, and Morali agreed to compose the whole soundtrack in addition to allowing the use of "To All of You" and "Obstacles".

The soundtrack of Life Is Strange has won numerous awards including: Best Soundtrack at the 2015 PlayStation Universe awards, best soundtrack at the Game Informer Best of 2015 awards and best soundtrack at the Titanium Awards.

Morali also composed the Life Is Strange 2 original score.

Other projects 

Jonathan has also composed music for plays, radio plays, opera and museums.

2016: Original creation around Dante's Inferno for France Culture radio, with Syd matters members. It will be played at Avignon festival.

2019–2020 : Soundtrack creation of Pas de deux play by Julien Favart.

2019–2020 : Original creation for Abu Dhabi's Louvre museum.

2020: Original creation around Franz Kafka's "La 'Métamorphose, still with Syd matters, for France Culture radio.

 Video games 

 Life Is Strange  (2015)
 Life Is Strange 2 (2018)

 Film 

 As Jonathan Morali 

 Avant qu'il ne soit trop tard by Laurent Dussaux (2004)
 Les Adoptés by Mélanie Laurent (2010)
 Mauvaise Fille by Patrick Mille (2012)
 Möbius by Éric Rochant (2013)
 Tout en haut du monde by Rémi Chayé (2015)
 L'Échappée belle by Émilie Cherpitel (2015)
 Le Nouveau by Rudi Rosenberg (2015)
 Druga strana svega (documentary film) by Mila Turajlić (2017)
 Au fil du monde by Jill Coulon and Isabelle Dupuy-Chavanat (Arte TV documentary series) (2017)

 As Syd Matters 

 Goodbye Mélodie (short) by David Barrouk (2005)
 La Question Humaine by Nicolas Klotz (2007)
 Les Grandes Grandes Vacances Animated series (2015)

 Albums (Syd Matters) 

Studio albums
 A Whisper and A Sigh (2003)
 Someday We Will Foresee Obstacles (2006)
 Ghost Days (2008)
 Brotherocean (2011)

Singles/EPs
 End & Start Again (2002)
 Fever In Winter, Shiver In June (2002)
 Everything Else (2007)
 Hi Life (2010)

CompilationsSyd Matters (2006)

Awards

|-
| style="text-align:center"|2002
| Syd Matters – A Whisper and a Sigh| CQFD Inrocks Mag
| 
|-
| style="text-align:center"|2008
| La Question humaine| Victoires de la musique,  "Album de musique originale de cinéma ou de télévision"
| 
|-
| style="text-align:center"|2015
| Life Is Strange (video game)| Fun and Serious Game Festival – ES Titanium Awards – Best Soundtrack
| 
|-
| style="text-align:center"|2015
| Life Is Strange| US DarkCast: Games of the Year 2015 – Best Music
| 
|-
| style="text-align:center"|2015
| Life Is Strange| Quebec PlayStation Universe 2015 Awards – Best Musical Soundtrack
| 
|-
| style="text-align:center"|2015
| Life Is Strange| US Game Informer – Best Of 2015 Awards – Best Soundtrack
| 
|-
| style="text-align:center"|2015
| Life Is Strange| Golden Joystick Awards – Best Audio
| 
|-
| style="text-align:center"|2015
| Life Is Strange| Paste Magazine – Best Videogame Soundtracks
| 
|-
| style="text-align:center"|2015
| Life Is Strange| Hardcore Gamer – Best of 2015 – Best Licensed Soundtrack
| 
|-
| style="text-align:center"|2015
| Life Is Strange| Game Revolution – Best of 2015 Awards – Best Soundtrack
| 
|-
| style="text-align:center"|2015
| Life Is Strange| Playstation Blog – Game of the Year – Best Soundtrack
| 
|-
| style="text-align:center"|2015
| Life Is Strange| National Academy of Video Game Trade Reviewers – Original Light Mix Score, New IP
| 
|-
| style="text-align:center"|2015
| Life Is Strange| National Academy of Video Game Trade Reviewers – To All Of You – Song, Original or Adapted
| 
|-
| style="text-align:center"|2015
| Life Is Strange| National Academy of Video Game Trade Reviewers – Song Collection
| 
|-
| style="text-align:center"|2015
| Life Is Strange| Ping Awards – Meilleure Bande-son
| 
|-
| style="text-align:center"|2016
| Life Is Strange| Polygon – Emotional Game Awards – Best Emotional Music
| 
|-
| style="text-align:center"|2017
| Tout en haut du monde| European Animation Awards – Best Soundtrack in a Feature Film Production
| 
|-
| style="text-align:center"|2018
| Life Is Strange 2| Ping Awards – Meilleure Bande-son
| 
|-
| style="text-align:center"|2019
| Life Is Strange 2''
| Académie des Arts et Techniques du Jeu Vidéo – Pégases – Meilleure Univers Sonore
| 
|}

References

External links
 Jonathan Morali website
 Syd Matters website

21st-century French musicians
21st-century French composers
French film score composers
Video game composers
1980 births
Living people